Tahara is a 2020 American drama film directed by Olivia Peace and written by Jess Zeidman. It premiered at the 2020 Slamdance Film Festival and was released to wide audiences on June 10, 2022. Tahara received awards from Outfest, Newfest, and the Denver International Film Festival.

Plot 
The movie "stars Sennott as high schooler Hannah, who kisses her best friend Carrie (Madeline Grey DeFreece) at the funeral of a Hebrew School classmate who died by suicide. The girls’ grieving process gives way to a journey of self-discovery and sexual coming-of-age awakening as Carrie starts to develop feelings for Hannah."

Cast and characters 
 Madeline Grey DeFreece as Carrie Lowstein
 Rachel Sennott as Hannah Rosen
 Daniel Taveras as Tristan Leibotwitz
 Bernadette Quigley as Moreh Klein
 Shlomit Azoulay as Elaina Cohen

Production 
Tahara is the feature film debut for director Olivia Peace and screenwriter Jess Zeidman. The movie is shot primarily in a square aspect ratio of 1.2:1. At times claymation and animation are used to illustrate the lead characters' inner lives. The cinematographer was Tehillah De Castro.

Release 
The film was released at Slamdance 2020 in January and later screened at NewFest 2020, TIFF, and Outfest 2020. Tahara was released in theaters on June 10, 2022.

Reception 
Tahara holds a 97% on Rotten Tomatoes based on 31 critics' reviews. Teo Bugbee of the New York Times selected Tahara as a NYT Critic's Pick and stated in the review, "This is a canny, compact portrait of teenage insensitivity, all the more riveting for its biting dialogue and funny performances." In a similarly positive review, Film Inquiry's Kristy Strouse wrote, "Peace and Zeidman’s collaboration proves to be a touching, (heartbreaking at times) story that takes one day and shows the momentous connotations of it." Autostraddle critic Drew Gregory praised the cast and writing: "It’s a cast that lives up to the obviously hilarious and subtly complex script from Jess Zeidman. There are enough jokes and hijinks that its depth and emotion surprise and continue surprising after the film has ended." Alan Ng rated the film 8.5/10 for Film Threat and praised the comic aspects of the film: "I would also be remiss in not highlighting how funny Tahara is. The note-writing conversion during the memorial service is amazing, and the joke of it is present and never called out by the film. Then add the school counselor and her class handouts about how grief is handled in the Jewish tradition; it’s all priceless."

Accolades 
 2020 – Winner, Best Directorial Feature Debut of a Black LGBTQ+ Filmmaker, NewFest
 2020 – Winner, Special Mention, LA Outfest
 2020 – Nominee, Best Narrative Feature, Slamdance Film Festival
 2021 – Winner, Best Feature Film, Denver International Film Festival

See also
Shiva Baby

References

External links 

 
 
 
 

2020 films
American coming-of-age drama films
2020s coming-of-age drama films
Films about Jews and Judaism
LGBT-related drama films
African-American drama films
Films about LGBT and Judaism
African-American LGBT-related films
2022 LGBT-related films
2020s English-language films
2020s American films